Jean Duprat (22 December 1760–31 October 1793) was active in the French Revolution in Avignon. At the start of the revolution, he supported the annexation of Avignon by France. He was suspected of involvement in the Massacres of La Glacière in 1791. He was elected as mayor of Avignon in 1792.

He was also a deputy in the National Assembly, and voted for the execution of the king. He was among the Girondin deputies arrested in 1793. He was tried and guillotined in Paris. His brother was Jean Étienne Benoît Duprat.

References 

1760 births
1793 deaths
Mayors of Avignon
Girondins
Members of the National Assembly (France)
French people executed by guillotine during the French Revolution
Regicides of Louis XVI